Frank Farrell may refer to:

Frank J. Farrell (1866–1926), American baseball executive
Frank Farrell (rugby league) (1916–1985), Australian rugby league footballer and policeman
Frank Farrell (musician) (1947–1997), bassist of Supertramp
Franklin Farrell (1908–2003), American ice hockey player

See also
 Frank O'Farrell